Ditidaht (also Nitinaht, Nitinat, Southern Nootkan) or diitiidʔaaʔtx̣ is a South Wakashan (Nootkan) language spoken on the southern part of Vancouver Island. Nitinaht is related to the other South Wakashan languages, Makah and the neighboring Nuu-chah-nulth.

Status and history
The number of native Ditidaht speakers dwindled from about thirty in the 1990s to just eight by 2006. In 2003 the Ditidaht council approved construction of a $4.2 million community school to teach students on the Ditidaht (Malachan) reserve their language and culture from kindergarten to Grade 12. The program was successful in its first years and produced its first high-school graduate in 2005. In 2014, the number of fluent Ditidaht speakers was 7, the number of individuals who have a good grasp on the language 6, and there were 55 people learning the language.

Ditidaht has been the subject of considerable linguistic research including the publication of texts and, in 1981, an introductory university-level textbook.

Characteristics
The reason for the unusual discrepancy in the names Nitinaht and Ditidaht is that when the Ditidaht people were first contacted by Europeans, they had nasal consonants (/m/, /n/) in their language. Their autonym of Nitinaht was what the Europeans recorded for them and their language. Soon afterward the consonants shifted to voiced plosives (/b/, /d/) as part of an areal trend, so the people came to call themselves Ditidaht. Ditidaht is thus one of only a handful of languages in the world that do not have nasal consonants.

Phonology

Consonants

Vowels 
They are noted phonetically as:

See also
Ditidaht First Nation

Notes

External links
Ditidaht Language on First Nations Languages of British Columbia site
 Ditidaht Language on FirstVoices.ca

Ditidaht First Nation
Wakashan languages
Indigenous languages of the Pacific Northwest Coast
First Nations languages in Canada
Endangered Wakashan languages